Saint-Germain-en-Laye is a commune in the Yvelines department in the Île-de-France in north-central France. It is located in the western suburbs of Paris,  from the centre of Paris.

Inhabitants are called Saint-Germanois or Saint-Germinois. With its elegant tree-lined streets it is one of the more affluent suburbs of Paris, combining both high-end leisure spots and exclusive residential neighborhoods (see the Golden Triangle of the Yvelines).

Saint-Germain-en-Laye is a sub-prefecture of the department. It occupies a large loop of the Seine. Saint-Germain-en-Laye lies at one of the western termini of Line A of the RER.

History

Saint-Germain-en-Laye was founded in 1020 when King Robert the Pious (ruled 996–1031) founded a convent on the site of the present Church of Saint-Germain.

In 1688, James II of England exiled himself to the city after being deposed from the throne in what has become known as the Glorious Revolution. He spent the remainder of his days there, and died on 16 September 1701.

Prior to the French Revolution in 1789, it had been a royal town and the Château de Saint-Germain the residence of numerous French monarchs. The old château was constructed in 1348 by King Charles V on the foundations of an old castle (château-fort) dating from 1238 in the time of Saint Louis.  Francis I was responsible for its subsequent restoration.  In 1862, Napoleon III set up the Musée des Antiquités Nationales in the erstwhile royal château. This museum has exhibits ranging from Paleolithic to Celtic times.  The "Dame de Brassempouy" sculpted on a mammoth's ivory tusk around 23,000 years ago is the most famous exhibit in the museum.

Kings Henry IV and Louis XIII left their mark on the town. Louis XIV was born in the château (the city's coat of arms consequently shows a cradle and the date of his birth), and established Saint-Germain-en-Laye as his principal residence from 1661 to 1681. Louis XIV turned over the château to James VII & II of Scotland and England after his exile from Britain after the Glorious Revolution in 1688. James lived in the Château for 13 years, and his daughter Louisa Maria Stuart was born in exile here in 1692. James II is buried in the parish church.

The terrace provides a view over the valley of the Seine and, in the distance, Paris. During the French Revolution, the name was changed along with many other places whose names held connotations of religion or royalty. Temporarily, Saint-Germain-en-Laye became Montagne-du-Bon-Air. During his reign, Napoleon I established his cavalry officers training school in the Château-Vieux.

The Treaty of Saint-Germain was signed in 1919 and was applied on 16 July 1920. The treaty officially registered the breakup of the Habsburg empire, which recognized the independence of Czechoslovakia, Poland, Hungary, and the Kingdom of the Serbs, Croats, and Slovenes (Yugoslavia).

During the occupation from 1940 to 1944, the town was the headquarters of the German Army. 

On 1 January 2019, the former commune Fourqueux was merged into Saint-Germain-en-Laye.

Saint-Germain parish church

The parish church, which is dedicated to Germain of Paris, was originally constructed in the eleventh century, and the present building (the fourth on the site) was built in the 1820s in a Neoclassical style, with six Tuscan columns supporting a pediment on the main façade. The church houses the mausoleum of James II of England and was visited by Queen Victoria in 1855.

The organ, originally installed in 1698, was rebuilt by Aristide Cavaillé-Coll in the nineteenth century and refurbished in 1903. The church's organists have included Albert Renaud (1891–1924), Albert Alain (1924–1971) and Marie-Claire Alain (1971–2010).

Population

The population data in the table and graph below refer to the commune of Saint-Germain-en-Laye proper, in its geography at the given years. The population of Fourqueux, absorbed in 2019, is not included.

Transport
Saint-Germain-en-Laye is connected to other communes by the Résalys bus network operated by Transdev Montesson-les-Rabeaux. Saint-Germain-en-Laye is served by Saint-Germain-en-Laye station on Paris RER line A.

It is also served by two stations on the Transilien Paris-Saint-Lazare suburban rail line: Saint-Germain-Bel-Air–Fourqueux and Saint-Germain–Grande Ceinture.

Saint-Germain-en-Laye is also served by Achères–Grand-Cormier station on Paris RER line A and on the Transilien Paris – Saint-Lazare suburban rail line. This station is located in the middle of the Forest of Saint-Germain-en-Laye, far from the urbanized part of the commune.

Sport

Football
Saint-Germain-en-Laye has a proud footballing history. From 1904 to 1970, it was represented by Stade Saint-Germain, but following a 1970 merger with Paris FC, became Paris Saint-Germain (PSG). PSG is a top-flight football team that is the most successful team in France in terms of trophies.

Sporting facilities
There is one main sporting facility in Saint-Germain-en-Laye: the Stade Municipal Georges Lefèvre. It covers over 12 hectares and contains:
– 5 football pitches
– 3 stands
– 1 athletic track
– 22 tennis courts
– 1 clubhouse
– 1 multibeach terrain

Economy
Capcom Entertainment France, a Capcom subsidiary, has its head office in Saint-Germain-en-Laye.

Education
 the schools in this commune had 20,581 students, with 7,300 of them living in Saint-Germain-en-Laye. There is a high ratio of overall students to town inhabitants. The municipal nursery and primary schools have 3,549 students. 1,026 students attend private schools in the commune. 522 students attend the Lycée International de Saint Germain-en-Laye nursery and primary divisions.

Schools
 the municipality operates ten nursery schools and nine primary schools.

The Lycée International de Saint Germain-en-Laye, a public school, consistently ranks among France's top schools and is considered to be the country's best public international school. It includes 14 different language sections, including one for Japanese students, and the Japanese Ministry of Education, Culture, Sports, Science and Technology (MEXT) lists that program in its group of European hoshuko (part-time Japanese educational programmes).

Other public high schools:
 Lycée Jeanne-d'Albret
 Lycée technologique Léonard-de-Vinci
 Lycée technologique Jean-Baptiste-Poquelin
 

Private schools include:
 Collège et Lycée Notre-Dame
 

The Institut d'études politiques de Saint-Germain-en-Laye and Collège Marcel Roby are located in the city.

Libraries
There are two libraries:
 Bibliothèque multimédia
 Bibliothèque George-Sand

In art

Hospital 
 Centre hospitalier intercommunal de Poissy-Saint-Germain-en-Laye

Notable people 
Saint-Germain-en-Laye was the birthplace of:

Nobility
 Henry II (1519–1559), King of France
 Marie of France (1344–1404), Duchess of Bar
 Jeanne d'Albret (1528–1572), Queen Regnant of Navarre
 Charles IX (1550–1574), King of France
 Louis de Buade de Frontenac (1622–1698), French courtier and Governor of New France
 Louis XIV (1638–1715), King of France
 Philippe I, Duke of Orléans, (1640–1701), younger brother of Louis XIV
 Louisa Maria Teresa Stuart (1692–1712), daughter of James II of England, known to Jacobites as the Princess Royal
 Charles O'Gara (1699–1777), a courtier and official of the Holy Roman Empire of Jacobite Irish descent

Musicians
 Albert Renaud (1855–1924), organist
 Claude Debussy (1862–1918), composer
 Albert Alain (1880–1971), composer and organist
 Jehan Alain (1911–1940), composer 
 Marie-Claire Alain (1926–2013), organist and organ teacher
 Benoît Delbecq (born 1966), jazz pianist and composer

Sports
 Mohamed Haddadou (born 1974), footballer
 Amélie Mauresmo (born 1979), tennis player
 Ismael Gace (born 1986), footballer
 Christopher Oualembo (born 1987), footballer
 Jonathan Eysseric (born 1990), tennis player
 Frédéric Vieillot (born 1990), footballer
 Caroline Garcia (born 1991), tennis player
 Rashad Muhammed (born 1993), footballer
 Gabriel Aubry (born 1998), racing driver

Scientists
 Jean Albert Gaudry (1827–1908), geologist and palaeontologist
 Salomon Reinach (1858–1932), archaeologist
 Sylvie Vauclair (born 1946), astrophysicist

Other
 John Patrick O'Gara (born 1692), soldier in the Spanish Army of Jacobite Irish descent
 Charles Gautier de Vinfrais (1704–1797), hunter and encyclopédiste
 Louis-Michel Letort de Lorville (1773–1815), French general of the Napoleonic Wars
 Jaque Catelain (1897–1965), actor
 Jacques Fesch (1930–1957), Christian mystic
 Jean-Jacques Lafaye (born 1958), writer, essayist
 Albert Dupontel (born 1964), actor
 Emmanuelle Polack (born 1965), art historian
 Virginie Greiner (born 1969), comic book scriptwriter 
 Christian de Boisredon (born 1974), social entrepreneur 
 Mélanie Thierry (born 1981), French actress
 Marion Maréchal-Le Pen (born 1989), French politician

The town is also associated with:

 James II of England, king who lived there in exile and is buried there
 Charles-Hippolyte de Paravey, French engineer who died in the city
 Gérard de Nerval (1808–1855), poet, who lived there during part of his childhood and adolescence
 Gabriel de Mortillet (1821-1898) French archeologist and anthropologist, mayor of the town in 1882-1888
 Pierre de Porcaro (1904–1945), priest and prisoner-of-war during the Second World War

Twin towns - sister cities
Saint-Germain-en-Laye is twinned with:
  Aschaffenburg, Germany, since 1975
  Schwelm, Germany
  Ayr, South Ayrshire, Scotland, since 1984
  Winchester, Massachusetts, United States, since 1990
  Konstancin-Jeziorna, Poland, since 1992

See also

 Communes of the Yvelines department
 The works of Antonin Mercié

References

External links

 Saint-Germain-en-Laye
 Saint-Germain-en-Laye 
 Saint-Germain-en-Laye 
 
 German bunkers in Saint-Germain-en-Laye

Communes of Yvelines
Communes nouvelles of Yvelines
Cities in Île-de-France
Subprefectures in France
1020 establishments in Europe
1020s establishments in France
Populated places established in the 11th century